A pastille is a type of sweet or medicinal pill made of a thick liquid that has been solidified and is meant to be consumed by light chewing and allowing it to dissolve in the mouth. The term is also used to describe certain forms of incense.

A pastille is also known as a troche, which is a medicated lozenge that dissolves like sweets.

Origins
The word pastille comes from the same origin as pastry, from the Latin word pastillus, for a lump of meal or grain, which was from panis, "bread".

A pastille was originally a pill-shaped lump of compressed herbs, which was burnt to release its medicinal properties. Literary references to the burning of medicinal pastilles include the short story "The Birth-Mark" by Nathaniel Hawthorne, the poem "The Laboratory" by Robert Browning, and the novel Jane Eyre by Charlotte Brontë. They are also mentioned in the novel McTeague by Frank Norris, when the title character's wife burns them to mask an unpleasant odor in the couple's rooms. In Dashiell Hammett's The Maltese Falcon, "a half-filled package of violet pastilles" is among the items found in Joel Cairo's pockets. In Alexandre Dumas's The Count of Monte Cristo, pastilles are used for the delivery of both medicine and poison.
They were also widely used during the eighteenth century in Western cultures to take herbal curatives and medicines, which eventually were developed into sweets.

Production
Pastilles are made by pouring a thick liquid into a powdered, sugared, or waxed mold and then allowing the liquid to set and dry. The substances contained in the dried liquid are slowly released when chewed and allowed to dissolve in the mouth. The substances are then absorbed by the mucous membranes of the oral cavity or in the lower gastro-intestinal tracts. Various substances, be they of medicinal nature or for flavour, can be put into pastille forms.

Due to the oily nature of these active substances (essential oils, tinctures and extracts), pastilles are usually based on mixtures of starch and gum arabic, which emulsifies the substance and binds them in a hydrocolloidal matrix. The starch and gum also reduces the rate in which the pastille dissolves and moderates the amount of active substances delivered at a time. Gum arabic also hardens the pastilles and makes them more sturdy in storage and transport.

Types
Well known pastille type candies include:
 Fisherman's Friend medicinal sweets
 Läkerol
 Violets
 Mason Dots
 Mentos
 Mint (candy)
 Pine Bros. throat drops
 Vocalzone Throat Pastilles, natural throat pastilles for voice overuse
 Jujube
 Rowntree's Fruit Pastilles, small round sweets
 Vichy Pastilles, octagonal candy pastilles
 Wine gum
 Grether's Pastilles
 Pastiglie Leone, Herbal digestives and candy pastilles

See also

Gum drops
Throat lozenge

References

__notoc__

Medical treatments
Confectionery